Events from the year 1732 in Great Britain.

Incumbents
 Monarch – George II
 Regent – Caroline, Queen Consort (starting 7 June, until 26 September)
 Prime Minister – Robert Walpole (Whig)
 Parliament – 7th

Events
 14 February – first performance of Henry Fielding's comedy The Modern Husband, at the Royal Theatre on Drury Lane in London.
 3 March – Captain Charles Gough rediscovers Gough Island in the South Atlantic.
 30 March – MPs John Birch and Denis Bond are expelled from the House of Commons after using their positions on the Commission for Forfeited Lands to make fraudulent sales.
 April–May – first performances of George Frideric Handel's oratorio Esther, in London.
 9 June – James Oglethorpe is granted a royal charter for the colony of Georgia.
 7 December – the original Theatre Royal, Covent Garden, London (the modern–day Royal Opera House) is opened by John Rich.

Undated
 Act provides that any man after 24 June 1733 charged on oath with being the father of an illegitimate child should be imprisoned until he provides a financial bond to indemnify the parish from liability for it under the Poor Law.
 Secession Church formed in Scotland.
 Trinity House moors the world's first lightship at the Nore in the Thames Estuary.

Births
 February – Charles Churchill, satirist and poet (died 1764)
 19 February – Richard Cumberland, dramatist (died 1811)
 April – George Colman the Elder, dramatist and essayist (died 1794)
 13 April – Frederick North, Lord North, Prime Minister (died 1792)
 6 October – Nevil Maskelyne, Astronomer Royal (died 1811)
 6 December – Warren Hastings, colonial administrator (died 1818)
 23 December – Richard Arkwright, inventor (died 1792)

Deaths
 12 January – John Horsley, archaeologist (born c. 1685)
 22 January – Louis de Sabran, theologian (born 1652)
 6 February – Anne Scott, 1st Duchess of Buccleuch, wealthy Scottish peeress (born 1651)
 7 February – William Hiseland, soldier, reputed supercentenarian (born 1620)
 22 February – Francis Atterbury, bishop and man of letters (born 1663)
 20 May – Thomas Boston, Scottish church leader (born 1676)
 30 May – John King, churchman (born 1652)
 1 June – Benedict Leonard Calvert, Governor of Maryland (born 1700)
 16 July – Woodes Rogers, privateer and first Royal Governor of the Bahamas (born c. 1679)
 6 October – George Duckett, politician (born 1684)
 26 November – Charles Sergison, politician (born 1655)
 4 December –  John Gay, poet and dramatist (born 1685)

References

 
Years in Great Britain